Thomas Henry Cookes (25 October 1804 – 29 September 1900) was a British Member of Parliament.

Cookes lived at Bentley Hall in Worcestershire, and was a captain in the county yeomanry.  He was also a magistrate and a deputy lieutenant of the county.  He stood for the Whigs in East Worcestershire at the 1832 UK general election, winning the seat.  He held the seat in 1835, and stood down at the 1837 UK general election.

References

 | after  = Horace St Paul
 | after2 = John Barneby

1804 births
1900 deaths
UK MPs 1832–1835
UK MPs 1835–1837
Whig (British political party) MPs for English constituencies